Anthony William Chute (b Basingstoke 17 December 1884 - d Basingstoke 2 April 1958) was Archdeacon of Basingstoke from 1948 until his death.

Turner was born at The Vyne and educated at Winchester; Magdalen College, Oxford; and Ripon College Cuddesdon. He was ordained in 1912. He was at the Winchester College Mission in Portsmouth until 1916 when he became a Chaplain to the Forces. In 1919 he became Vicar of St Oswald, West Hartlepool; and in 1925 Fellow and Dean of Divinity of his old Oxford college. He was Vicar of Highfield, Southampton from 1929 to 1936; and then Basingstoke until his death.

Notes

1884 births
People from Sherborne St John
People educated at Winchester College
Fellows of Magdalen College, Oxford
Alumni of Ripon College Cuddesdon
Archdeacons of Basingstoke
1958 deaths
World War I chaplains
Clergy from Southampton